In nuclear magnetic resonance spectroscopy and magnetic resonance imaging, the Ernst angle is the flip angle (a.k.a. "tip" or "nutation" angle) for excitation of a particular spin that gives the maximal signal intensity in the least amount of time when signal averaging over many transients. In other words, the highest signal-to-noise ratio can be achieved in a given amount of time. This relationship was described by Richard R. Ernst, winner of the 1991 Nobel Prize in Chemistry.

Consider a single pulse sequence consisting of (1) an excitation pulse with flip angle , (2) the recording of the time domain signal (Free induction decay, FID) for a duration known as acquisition time , and (3) a delay until the next excitation pulse (here called interpulse delay ). This sequence is repeated back-to-back many times and the sum or the average of all recorded FIDs ("transients") is calculated. Then a 90° flip angle will yield the maximum signal intensity (or signal-to-noise ratio) per number of averaged FIDs. For shorter intervals between excitation pulses compared to the longitudinal relaxation, partial longitudinal relaxation until the next excitation pulse leads to signal loss in the subsequent FID. This signal loss can be minimized by reducing the flip angle. The optimal signal-to-noise ratio for a given combination of longitudinal relaxation time and delay between excitation pulses is obtained at the Ernst angle:

.

For example, to obtain the highest signal-to-noise ratio for a signal with  set to match the signal's , the optimal flip angle is 68°.

An NMR spectrum or an in vivo MR spectrum most of the time consists of signals of more than one spin species which can exhibit different longitudinal relaxation times. Therefore, the calculated Ernst angle may apply only to the selected one of the many signals in the spectrum and other signals may be less intense than at their own Ernst angle. In contrast in standard MRI, the detected signal of interest is predominantly that of a single spin species, the water 1H spins.

This relationship is especially important in magnetic resonance imaging where the sum of interscan delay  and acquisition time  is often short relative to the signal's  value. In the MRI community, this sum is often known as repetition time , thus

,

and, consequently,

References

Nuclear magnetic resonance spectroscopy
Magnetic resonance imaging